Sankt Peter is a municipality in the district of Breisgau-Hochschwarzwald in Baden-Württemberg in Germany.

Geography

Location
St. Peter is a climatic spa located within the Southern Black Forest Nature Park, on the southern flank of the Kandel, about 12 miles east of Freiburg im Breisgau.

Administrative structure
To the municipality of St. Peter belong the village of Bürgerschaft, the hamlet of Sägendobel, the settlements of Kandelberg, Neuwelt, Oberibental, Ränke, Rohr, Schmittenbach, Schönhöfe, Seelgut and Willmendobel and the farmsteads of Eckpeterhof, Langeck and Lindlehof.

History 
The Abbey of St. Peter in the Black Forest was founded in 1093 by the Duke of Zähringen, Berthold II as his house abbey and family burial site. The municipality developed gradually over time around the abbey.

When the estates of the Church were seized and sold or transferred during Napoleon's conquest of Europe, the village of St. Peter was handed to the Grand Duchy of Baden in 1806 and, since 1952, they have been part of the state of Baden-Württemberg.

In 1899, fire broke out in the village centre of St. Peter, whereupon 23 houses were destroyed and 150 people made homeless.

At the end of the Second World War there was a Reich training centre of the Hitler Youth in St. Peter.

Source: Statistisches Landesamt Baden-Württemberg (except 1806); 1871–1970: Census results

Gallery

References

External links

  St. Peter: History and images
  St. Peter

Towns in Baden-Württemberg
Breisgau-Hochschwarzwald
Baden